Holding Court may refer to:

 "Holding Court" (song), a song by Axium
 Holding Court (horse), a British Thoroughbred racehorse and sire